John Raymond Purcell (born May 8, 1952, New York City) is an American jazz saxophonist.

Biography
Purcell was raised in Westchester, New York, where he started on French horn before switching to saxophone. He attended the Manhattan School of Music, achieving his master's degree in 1978, then formed a 22-piece ensemble based in Westchester; Frank Foster co-led the ensemble for a time. In 1975 Purcell developed a tumor on his larynx, which prevented him from playing for a year; he devoted this time to studying instrument design.

In the late 1970s and early 1980s Purcell worked freelance in many local New York ensembles and in Broadway pit orchestras. He played with Machito's Afro-Cuban Big Band, Chico Hamilton, Sam Rivers, Onaje Allen Gumbs (1983), Muhal Richard Abrams (1983–90), He recorded with the Roger Dawson septet featuring Hilton Ruiz piano, Claudio Roditi trumpet, John Betsch drums, percussionist Milton Cardona and bassist Anthony Cox(1983). American Jazz Orchestra (1985–91), Third Kind of Blue with Ronnie Burrage and again with another date for Anthony Cox (1984–87), Tania Maria (1984), Henry Butler (1987) He did work as a consultant for film and television shows in the 1980s and 1990s, and appears in the 1985 film The Cotton Club.

Unlike many reed players, Purcell is proficient on virtually all the reeds from piccolo, bass clarinet, flute, alto flute, oboe, tenor, alto and soprano saxes, a great reader who is also an original improvisor which made him a natural to replace Julius Hemphill in "The World Saxophone Quartet" when Hemphill left the group due to illness.  Purcell was also a part of Jack DeJohnette's Special Edition This group also helped the careers of many lesser-known young horn players, as it had a rotating front line that included Purcell, David Murray, Arthur Blythe, Chico Freeman, and bassist Rufus Reid.

Purcell has taught at Westchester Conservatory (1970–80), Dwight Morrow High School (1976–79), Lehman College (1985–89), Rutgers (1987-90) and the Manhattan School of Music (1987–94). He also taught Jazz and World Music at the California State University at Monterey Bay in Seaside, California during the late 90s.

Discography

As leader
 1994: John Purcell & Sweeca: Trent Song
 1995: John Purcell (Mapleshade)
 1998: Saxello Christmas in Vienna
 1999: Little Ray of Sunshine

As sideman
With Muhal Richard Abrams
 Colors in Thirty-Third (Black Saint, 1986)
 The Hearinga Suite (Black Saint, 1989)

With Henry Butler
 The Village (Impulse!, 1987)
With Benny Carter
Central City Sketches (MusicMasters, 1987)
With Jack DeJohnette
 Tin Can Alley (ECM, 1980),
 Album Album (ECM, 1984),
 Inflation Blues (ECM, 1982)

With Dennis González
Stefan (Silkheart, 1987)

With Meco
Star Wars And Other Galactic Funk (Millennium, 1977)

With David Murray
 Live at Sweet Basil Volume 1 (Black Saint, 1984)
 Live at Sweet Basil Volume 2 (Black Saint, 1984)
 David Murray Big Band (DIW, 1991),
 South of the Border (DIW, 1992)

With David Sanborn
 Upfront (Elektra, 1992)
 Hearsay (Elektra, 1995)
 Pearls (Elektra, 1995)

With World Saxophone Quartet
 Four Now (Justin Time, 1995)
 Takin' It 2 the Next Level (Justin Time, 1996)
 Selim Sivad: a Tribute to Miles Davis (Justin Time, 1998)
 Requiem for Julius (Justin Time, 2000)
 25th Anniversary: The New Chapter (Justin Time, 2001)
 Steppenwolf (Justin Time, 2002)

References
Gary W. Kennedy, "John Purcell". Grove Jazz online.

American jazz saxophonists
American male saxophonists
Musicians from New York (state)
Living people
1952 births
World Saxophone Quartet members
21st-century American saxophonists
21st-century American male musicians
American male jazz musicians
American Jazz Orchestra members
Mapleshade Records artists